Autbod or Obode was a 7th-century Irish Christian missionary in areas that are now in Belgium and northern France. A companion of Foillan and Saint Ultan, he went on preaching circuits of Hainaut, Artois and Picardy before withdrawing to a hermitage near Laon, where he probably died around the year 690.

References

7th-century Frankish saints
7th-century Irish priests
Medieval Irish saints
Irish expatriates in France
Year of birth unknown
Year of death uncertain
690s deaths